Metridia longa is a copepod found in the Arctic, the north Atlantic, the Pacific, and surrounding waters.

Description
M. longa are bioluminescent, emitting light when mechanically, electrically, or chemically disturbed. This light is given through secretions containing luciferase from epidermal glands on the head and abdomen.

Distribution
M. longa is found in the sub-Arctic, Arctic, north Atlantic, and the Pacific, along the coast of the Americas and Asia. It has also been recorded in the Antarctic, in the Pacific Antarctic.

Ecology

Life history and reproduction
At least in Balsfjorden, M. longa breeds from early to mid-May. It uses recently ingested food to complete and release the eggs, but it likely uses stored lipids in oogenesis. It has an average clutch size of about 33 eggs, not accounting for cannibalism. These eggs hatch with about 51% success after their 24-hour incubation period. Stage I through V copepodites then develop during the summer. Stages I through III are usually found below about  during the day, and generally do not migrate. In Arctic waters, it is typically found closer to the surface. Also, in Balsfjorden, copepodite stages I through III were found to occur mostly in the top  of the fjord. Copepodite stages IV through to the adult stage are migratory, moving from the deeper waters it inhabits during the day to shallower waters at night to feed. This is hypothesized to be because it could reduce the chance of predation, as predators relying on sight would find it harder to detect their prey in the dark. This is further supported by the fact that it spends more time at the surface during the winter, when the nights are longer. It is likely active during this winter season. It also uses stored lipids to develop its gonads when it is overwintering.

Feeding
M. longa is an omnivorous filter-feeder. It has been suggested that it uses omnivory during the winter to supplement its metabolic needs and its gonad development.

References

Calanoida
Fauna of the Arctic Ocean
Crustaceans of the Atlantic Ocean
Crustaceans of the Pacific Ocean
Fauna of the Southern Ocean
Crustaceans described in 1854
Taxa named by John Lubbock, 1st Baron Avebury